Sean Merrett (born November 1, 1978), better known by his stage name Big Kuntry King, is an American rapper from Atlanta, Georgia. He is perhaps best known as a member of Southern hip hop group Pimp $quad Click, along with longtime friend and fellow Atlanta-based rapper T.I. After signing to T.I.'s Grand Hustle imprint, Big Kuntry King secured a recording contract with Atlantic Records. His debut studio album, My Turn to Eat, was released September 30, 2008.

Big Kuntry King is also the founder of his own record label imprint, Bread Box Muzic.

Life and career

1978–2007: Early life and career beginnings
Born in Charleston, South Carolina, Big Kuntry King was raised in a house that held his mother, sister, and close to ten members of his extended family. When he reached the fifth grade, Kuntry moved to Atlanta with his mother, who sought a better life for her kids. While his mom worked two jobs and pursued a community college degree, Kuntry gravitated to street life, where his family had a notorious history. "I was born in the game," says Kuntry. "My Grand Momma was in it before she died. My Auntie was in it; everybody was in it."

A couple of years after his father was released from a seven-year stint in federal prison, Kuntry started rapping as a way to earn extra money. In 1996, Kuntry befriended local up-and-coming rapper T.I., who was already known around Atlanta as a skilled lyricist, and together they sold mixtapes out the trunk of their car. "The raps, that was our dope," Kuntry says. "We was rapping because we knew we could make us enough money to buy something and get out. And it made us look good in our neighborhood and every other neighborhood in the A."

Big Kuntry King's first major feature spot came on T.I.'s debut studio album, I'm Serious (2001), on the song "Heavy Chevys." In between appearing on subsequent T.I. albums like Trap Muzik (2003) and Urban Legend (2004), Big Kuntry recorded and released several songs on his own, including "Still Country" and "Throwback." As a member of P$C, the Grand Hustle-signed five-man group released their debut album, 25 to Life, in 2005, which spawned the lead single, "I'm a King" featuring Lil' Scrappy. With the release of the P$C album, Big Kuntry was suddenly introduced to a nationwide audience but unfortunately for him, it wasn't his star that T.I. and Grand Hustle focused on making the brightest: "They had just signed Young Dro, and Tip made this song 'Shoulder Lean' for him, he threw some verses on it and it was a smash song. We was like damn, we've been here since day one killing it and you're going to come out with Young Dro? That's when I said man, I have to step this up."

In 2006, he was featured on the remix to T.I.'s "Top Back", also featuring Young Jeezy, Young Dro and B.G. The remix was included on the Grand Hustle compilation album Grand Hustle Presents: In da Streetz Volume 4 (2006).

2008–present: My Turn to Eat
While T.I. and the rest of the camp were overseas playing shows in Japan, Kuntry was in the studio by himself recording solo material. It didn't take long for Kuntry to craft the catchy tracks, "Yeah I'm On It" and "That's Right," which both featured Kuntry's drawn out signature adlib, You know who this is man, Big Kuntry King!. "I took all of my money and pressed up the 'Yeah I'm On It' record," he says. "And by the time they came back from Japan, I had two records on the radio and playing in the clubs." Determined to succeed, Kuntry was signed as a solo artist to Atlantic Records, where he released his solo debut studio album,  My Turn to Eat: "I always thought it was my turn to eat cause I'm hungry. All these people are eating more around me, so either I have to take some food off their plate."

After recording for close to a year, Kuntry's debut was a solid collection of songs produced by some of Atlanta's trend-setting track masters, including Shawty Redd and Marvelous J. On the song "Pots and Pans," Kuntry breaks down the difference between the music he was raised on Down South as opposed to what people up North were accustomed to hearing. On the Nard & B produced cut "Soul of a Man," Kuntry talks about the heavy expectations that are placed on men everyday, and the common struggle to always do the right thing. Kuntry's track "Posse" is all about repping where he's from and the company that he keeps: "If you listen to my album you're going to be rockin' the whole time," he says. "I hand-picked all of my beats and I'm very picky. A lot of people tell me I got an ear and I appreciate it 'cause this ear is going to get me paid." Cha-ching!". "I think my music is like Dr. Jekyll and Mr. Hyde," he says. "It's like, he's funny, he's cracking jokes but he's serious ain't he? It's a psychological thing; I don't think a lot of rappers are like that." The album, released September 30, 2008, debuted at #98 on the Billboard 200.

On February 27, 2012, Big Kuntry King released a mixtape titled 100% (KANE), including production from Zaytoven, Nard & B and Two Band Geeks and features a guest appearance from T.I. On December 12, 2012 Big Kuntry King released another mixtape, Dope & Champagne.

Discography

Studio albums

Compilation albums

Mixtapes

Singles

As lead artist

As featured artist

Guest appearances

References

External links
 

Living people
1978 births
African-American male rappers
American male rappers
African-American songwriters
Songwriters from South Carolina
Rappers from Atlanta
Southern hip hop musicians
Grand Hustle Records artists
21st-century American rappers
21st-century American male musicians
21st-century African-American musicians
20th-century African-American people
American male songwriters